The 3rd British Academy Video Games Awards (known for the purposes of sponsorship as British Academy Video Games Awards in Association with N-Gage), awarded by the British Academy of Film and Television Arts, was an award ceremony held on 5 October 2006 in The Roundhouse. The ceremony honoured achievement in 2006 and was hosted by Vernon Kay. Tom Clancy's Ghost Recon Advanced Warfighter, LocoRoco & Shadow of the Colossus were the major winners on the night, taking two awards.

Winners and nominees
Winners are shown first in bold.

Games with multiple nominations and wins

Nominations

Wins

External links
3rd BAFTA Video Games Awards page

British Academy Games Awards ceremonies
2006 awards in the United Kingdom
2006 in video gaming
October 2006 events in the United Kingdom